Warner Anderson (March 10, 1911 – August 26, 1976) was an American actor.

Early years
Anderson was born to "a theatrical family" in Brooklyn, New York, March 10, 1911. He was a Republican.

Film
Anderson had a small part in a film in 1915. A contemporary newspaper article about the movie Sunbeam, in which Anderson appeared in 1917, noted, "Warner Anderson is one of the cleverest children in motion pictures." "He made his adult screen debut in This Is the Army in 1943.

He had supporting parts in several films through the years. They included The Caine Mutiny, Blackboard Jungle, and Destination Tokyo. Operation Burma with Errol Flynn.

Stage
Anderson's work on stage included Broadway appearances in Maytime (1917–1918), Happiness (1917–1918), Medea (1920), Within Four Walls (1923), Broken Journey (1942), and Remains to Be Seen (1951–1952).

Radio
In the 1940s, Anderson was the announcer for The Bell Telephone Hour.

Television
Anderson starred as Lt. Ben Guthrie in the TV series The Lineup, which ran from 1954–60. In syndication, reruns of The Lineup were broadcast under the title San Francisco Beat. His The Lineup costar was Tom Tully. Anderson played the same role in the 1958 film The Lineup.

He played newspaper publisher Matthew Swain on the TV series Peyton Place. He also served as the narrator at the beginning of each episode. He continued as narrator even after his character was written out of the series.

Death
Anderson died August 26, 1976, at the age of 65, in a hospital in Santa Monica, California. He was survived by his wife and a son.

Partial filmography

 The Sunbeam (1916) – Bobby Rutherford
 This Is the Army (1943) – Kate Smith's Announcer (uncredited)
 Destination Tokyo (1943) – Andy
 Objective, Burma! (1945) – Col. J. Carter
 Dangerous Partners (1945) – Miles Kempen
 Her Highness and the Bellboy (1945) – Paul MacMillan
 Week-End at the Waldorf (1945) – Dr. Robert Campbell
 Abbott and Costello in Hollywood (1945) – Norman Royce
 My Reputation (1946) – Frank Everett
 Bad Bascomb (1946) – Luther Mason
 Faithful in My Fashion (1946) – Walter Medcraft
 Three Wise Fools (1946) – The O'Monahan
 The Arnelo Affair (1947) – Det. Sam Leonard
 The Beginning or the End (1947) – Captain William S. Parsons U.S.N.
 Dark Delusion (1947) – Teddy Selkirk
 Song of the Thin Man (1947) – Dr. Monolaw
 High Wall (1947) – Dr. George Poward
 Alias a Gentleman (1948) – Capt. Charlie Lopen
 Tenth Avenue Angel (1948) – Joseph Mills
 Command Decision (1948) – Colonel Earnest Haley
 The Lucky Stiff (1949) – Eddie Britt
 The Doctor and the Girl (1949) – Dr. George Esmond
 Destination Moon (1950) – Dr. Charles Cargraves
 Santa Fe (1951) – Dave Baxter
 Only the Valiant (1951) – Trooper Rutledge
 Go For Broke (1951) – Col. Charles W. Pence
 Bannerline (1951) – Roy
 Detective Story (1951) – Endicott Sims
 The Blue Veil (1951) – Bill Parker
 The Star (1952) – Harry Stone
 The Last Posse (1953) – Robert Emerson
 A Lion Is in the Streets (1953) – Jules Bolduc
 The Yellow Tomahawk (1954) – Major Ives
 The Caine Mutiny (1954) – Capt. Blakely
 Drum Beat (1954) – Gen. Canby
 The Violent Men (1954) – Jim McCloud
 Blackboard Jungle (1955) – Dr. Bradley
 A Lawless Street (1955) – Hamer Thorne
 The Lineup (1958) – Lt. Ben Guthrie
 Armored Command (1961) – Lt. Col. Wilson
 Rio Conchos (1964) – Col. Wagner
 The Bubble (1966) – Doctor (uncredited)
 Peyton Place (1964–1969, TV Series) – Narrator / Matthew Swain
 Bearcats! (1971, TV Series) – Mr. Huddleston

References

External links

1911 births
1976 deaths
20th-century American male actors
American male child actors
American male silent film actors
American male stage actors
American male television actors
California Republicans
Male actors from New York City
Male Western (genre) film actors
People from Brooklyn
People from Greater Los Angeles